Pat Upton (1 September 1944 – 22 February 1999) was an Irish Labour Party  politician and vet.

Early life
He was born in Kilrush, County Clare and educated at St Flannan's College in Ennis, at University College Galway, and at University College Dublin (UCD) where he received a doctorate in veterinary medicine. He then worked as a lecturer.

Political career
Upton was first elected to public office as a Labour Party member of Dublin County Council for Terenure at the 1991 local elections, where he served until the Council's abolition in 1994, and then as a member of South Dublin County Council until 1999.

He had unsuccessfully contested the Dublin South-Central constituency at the 1989 general election. However, he was then elected to the 19th Seanad on the Agricultural Panel, and became the Labour Party's leader in Seanad Éireann.

At the 1992 general election, he stood again in Dublin South-Central, and in Labour's "Spring Tide" surge at that election, Upton topped the poll with nearly 12,000 first-preference votes, a remarkable 1.48 quotas. He was re-elected at the 1997 general election with a considerably reduced vote.

In the 28th Dáil he was appointed as Labour's spokesperson on Justice, Equality and Law Reform. A leading critic of Labour's 1999 merger with the Democratic Left, he nonetheless became the party's spokesman on communications and sport after the merger.

He was a member of the Parliamentary Assembly of the Council of Europe in 1994–1995.

Death
He died suddenly of a heart attack on 22 February 1999 at the UCD veterinary school, where he was still an occasional lecturer, and was survived by his wife and their four children. Politicians of all parties paid glowing tributes to him an outspoken but "erudite and incisive" contributions to politics and to Irish culture.

The by-election for his Dáil seat in Dublin South-Central was held on 27 October 1999, and won for the Labour Party by his sister Mary Upton.

Honours
Following his death, the University College Dublin branch of the Labour party was named in his honour due to his involvement with the college. It has since been renamed to honour the Spanish Civil War veteran Charlie Donnelly.

References

1944 births
1999 deaths
Academics of University College Dublin
Alumni of the University of Galway
Alumni of University College Dublin
Councillors of Dublin County Council
Irish veterinarians
Labour Party (Ireland) senators
Labour Party (Ireland) TDs
Local councillors in South Dublin (county)
Members of the 19th Seanad
Members of the 27th Dáil
Members of the 28th Dáil
People educated at St Flannan's College
People from Kilrush
Politicians from County Clare